Akosua is an Akan given name to a female child born on Sunday (Kwasiada). Although some might believe it is mostly practised by the Ashanti people, it is actually practised by all Akan (i.e Ashanti, Akuapem, Akyem, Fante) people who follow traditional customs. People born on particular days are supposed to exhibit the characteristics or attributes and philosophy, associated with the days. Akosua has the appellation Dampo meaning agility. Thus, females named Akosua are supposed to be agile.

Origin and meaning 
In the Akan culture, day names are known to be derived from deities. Akosua  is originated from Koyasi and from the Lord of Life Descent deity  of the day Sunday. Females born on Sunday are known to be leaders in society or "clearer of the way" (obue-akwan). They are very inquisitive and tend to be pulled into a thing of interest.

Female variants 
Day names in Ghana have varying spellings. This is so because of the various Akan subgroups. Each Akan subgroup has a similar or different spelling for the day name to other Akan subgroups. Akosua is spelt Akosua by the Akuapem and Ashanti subgroups while the Fante subgroup spell it as Esi.

Male version 
In the Akan culture and other local cultures in Ghana, day names come in pairs for males and females. The variant of the name used for a male child born on Sunday is Kwasi or Akwasi.

Notable people with the name 
Most Ghanaian children have their cultural day names in combination with their English or Christian names. Some notable people with such names are:

 Akosua Addai Amoo Ghanaian Sports journalist
 Akosua Gyamama Busia Ghanaian actress
 Akosua Serwaa Ghanaian middle distance runner
 Akosua Frema Osei Opare Ghanaian politician
 Rebecca "Becca" Akosua Acheampomaa Acheampong Ghanaian singer, songwriter, and actress

See also 

 Akwasi

References 

Akan given names
Feminine given names